Jakob Abrahamson is a Swedish poet. His three poetry collections are published by the publishing house Ristaros in Täby, which only have published two other titles. Possibly, the name Jakob Abrahamson is a pseudonym for Svante Erhardson (born 1933).

Bibliography
2004 - Vår dotter sopsorterar : 2001-2002 : dikter annars nästan helt utan kärlek och sådant 
2005 - När Sverige fick Norge och Danmark Sören : 2000-talet : dikter och stapelessäer för läsare över sjuttio 
2006 - Säga vad man vill om EU och det gör man ju : rimmad vers och stapelprosa för pensionärer

External links
Jakob Abrahamson, Libris

Swedish poets
Swedish-language poets
Swedish male poets
Living people
Year of birth missing (living people)